Jerry "Topper" Toppazzini (July 29, 1931 — April 21, 2012) was a Canadian ice hockey forward who played twelve seasons in the National Hockey League, most notably for the Boston Bruins, between 1952 and 1964. A skilled defensive specialist and penalty killer, he set the then-NHL record for shorthanded goals in a season in 1958 with seven.

Playing career
Toppazzini was born and raised in Copper Cliff, Ontario. He began playing hockey for his local team in Copper Cliff before beginning his junior career. He played junior league hockey in the Ontario Hockey Association, most notably with the Barrie Flyers. In his final season with Barrie - 1951–52 - he led the team with 40 goals and 90 points in 54 games, going on to add another 34 points in 23 playoff games to spearhead the Flyers to its first Memorial Cup championship.

Signing with the Boston Bruins, he spent the following season with their American Hockey League farm team, the Hershey Bears, playing with his younger brother Teddy and helping the Bears to a division title with 20 goals and 45 points in 54 games.

In the subsequent 1952–1953 season, Toppazzini made his NHL debut with the Bruins, scoring 23 points in 69 games. The following season, splitting time between Hershey and the major league club, he was traded to the Chicago Black Hawks for center Gus Bodnar, and was subsequently dealt to the Detroit Red Wings in an eight-man multiplayer deal - at the time, the largest transaction in league history. He was traded back to the Bruins in 1956 for center Murray Costello and left wing Lorne Ferguson. Toppazzini made an immediate impact, as the Bruins -  in last place at the time - made a run for the playoffs, missing at the end by a single win.

Wearing #21, Toppazzini remained with Boston for the next nine seasons, blossoming into a skilled two-way player while playing on a line with smooth center Don McKenney and hard charging left wing Fleming Mackell; the trio was Boston's best line as they surged to the Stanley Cup finals in 1957, knocking off the heavily favored former Cup champion Detroit Red Wings en route. His best seasons statistically were 1958, when he scored a career high 25 goals in the regular season and added nine goals in the Stanley Cup playoffs (with a hat trick against the New York Rangers and three game-winning goals) in leading the Bruins to the Cup finals, as Boston would mount a serious challenge to the dynastic Montreal Canadiens for NHL supremacy and 1962, when he scored 19 goals en route to a career high 50 points. Always a fan favorite, he won the Elizabeth C Dufresne Trophy twice in a row, in 1956-57 and 1957–58, as the best performing and most popular Boston Bruin at home games. He was noted in his time with the Bruins for his "crazy chatter" in the locker room.  According to teammate Bronco Horvath:
"Topper was always giving everybody the business, keeping up a competitive atmosphere. Drove me nuts."

Boston traded the fading Toppazzini in the 1964 offseason, and he played the remaining four seasons of his professional career in the minor leagues, spending the 1965 season with the Pittsburgh Hornets of the AHL. His rights were then acquired by the Los Angeles Blades of the Western Hockey League in the 1965 Reverse Draft; he initially held out before joining the Blades for the 1966 and 1967 seasons.  He finished his playing career in 1968 as the player-coach of the Port Huron Flags of the International Hockey League.

Goaltending stint
On October 16, 1960, Toppazzini substituted for Boston goaltender Don Simmons, who was injured with thirty seconds left in a match against the Chicago Black Hawks, in which the Bruins were losing 5-2. At the time, teams were not required to carry a backup goaltender on the bench, although they were required to have one available in the arena.  Reportedly, Toppazzini did not want to wait for the Black Hawks' house goaltender to suit up. He faced no shots in his brief stint. By the 1965 playoffs, the NHL ruled that all teams must have a spare goaltender on the bench and ready to play. Toppazzini is thus the last position player to substitute in goal during an NHL match.

Coaching career
After his retirement as a player, Toppazzini was named coach of the Springfield Kings of the American Hockey League in 1972, but was let go after two seasons in which the Kings finished in last place both years. He went on to coach the Sudbury Wolves of the OHA between 1975 and 1977, and met with much better success, leading the team to a first and second-place finish and winning the Matt Leyden Trophy as the OHA's Coach of the Year award in 1976.

Retirement and death
After his retirement from coaching, Toppazzini settled in Sudbury, Ontario, where he opened a men's clothing store. He also opened a well-known Bruins-themed bar in Sudbury known as the "Beef n'Bird."  He remained active in local charitable affairs.

Toppazzini died on April 21, 2012 following a short illness.

Career statistics

Regular season and playoffs

Achievements and legacy
 Was named to play in the National Hockey League All-Star Game in 1955, 1958 and 1959. Also named to play in a benefit All-Star Game between the NHL All-Stars and the Buffalo Bisons in February, 1959.
 Led the NHL in games played with 70 in 1959 and 1962.
 Toppazzini's older brother Zellio, a long time star for the minor league Providence Reds, also played in the NHL for the Bruins and New York Rangers between the 1949 and 1951 seasons.
 On March 27, 1958, Toppazzini scored an overtime goal in the semifinals to defeat the Rangers 4-3.
 His grandnephew Justin Williams played in the NHL, starting in 2000
 As of October 2020, Toppazzini ranks 30th in Bruins history with 151 regular-season goals scored. 
 As of November 2014 Toppazzinni ranks 31st in Boston history in regular-season points scored.

Transactions
 February 16, 1954: Traded to Chicago Black Hawks for Gus Bodnar.
 May 27, 1955: Traded to Detroit Red Wings with Dave Creighton, Gord Hollingworth and John McCormack for Tony Leswick, Glen Skov, Johnny Wilson and Benny Woit.
 January 17, 1956: Traded to Boston Bruins with Real Chevrefils for Murray Costello and Lorne Ferguson.
 June 9, 1964: Traded to Chicago Black Hawks with Matt Ravlich for Murray Balfour and Mike Draper.
 October 10, 1964: Traded to Pittsburgh Hornets for Hank Ciesla.
 June 9, 1965: Claimed by Los Angeles Blades in Reverse Draft.

References

External links

1931 births
2012 deaths
Barrie Flyers players
Boston Bruins players
Canadian people of Italian descent
Canadian ice hockey forwards
Chicago Blackhawks players
Detroit Red Wings players
Ice hockey people from Ontario
Los Angeles Blades (WHL) players
Northern Ontario Hockey Association players
Pittsburgh Hornets players
Port Huron Flags (IHL) players
Sportspeople from Greater Sudbury
St. Catharines Teepees players